For the 2009-10 season, Botev Plovdiv will be competing in the A PFG.

Transfers

Summer Transfers

In:

Out:

Winter Transfers

In:

Out:

Players

Appearances and goals

Appearance and goalscoring records for all the players who are in the Botev Plovdiv first team squad during the 2009–10 season.

|-
|colspan="14"|Players not a part of the club after the start of the season:|}

TBI A Football Group

 League table 

ResultsNote: Results are given with Botev Plovdiv score listed first.Bulgarian Cup

ResultsNote: Results are given with Botev Plovdiv score listed first.''

References

Botev Plovdiv seasons
Botev Plovdiv